Rishiri may refer to:
Rishiri-kombu (Laminaria ochotensis), a type of kombu
  Rishiri Island, a Japanese island
 Rishiri, Hokkaidō, a town on Rishiri Island
 Mount Rishiri, a volcano on Rishiri island